Taken by Force is the fifth studio album by German band Scorpions, released by RCA Records in 1977. This was the first Scorpions album to feature drummer Herman Rarebell and the final studio album to feature guitarist Uli Jon Roth. Roth left the band in 1978 following the end of the album's tour, and was at first replaced by Michael Schenker and later by Matthias Jabs.

The lyrics to "We'll Burn the Sky" were initially a poem written by Monika Dannemann, the last girlfriend of Jimi Hendrix , as a tribute to him after he died.

Artwork 
The album cover photography was taken by Michael von Gimbut; his third Scorpions album cover commission. Like their previous two albums, Taken by Force caused controversy with its cover art which again resulted in the artwork being replaced in most markets with an alternative cover using photographs of the band members. The band's former lead guitarist Uli Jon Roth defended the original artwork in a 2008 interview, stating:

 I think the original idea was children playing with guns at a military cemetery in France and some people found that offensive. I don't think it's offensive because I think it was actually a quite a good image because it puts war totally into perspective; very often it is young people, eighteen, nineteen, going to war that don't fully understand life. When you're fifteen you don't fully understand life, but these guys then have to shoot other people simply because someone tells them to do it for their country. Politicians are sometimes also children with guns, in all periods of time a lot of politicians are far too trigger happy and war too easily becomes an "easy solution", whereas for me it should never be a solution, there should be no war in the first place. Maybe every once in a while a country may need to defend itself, I understand that, but in general if you consider that there are over a hundred wars raging in the present day on this planet alone then it's just sheer lunacy and always the tool of the Dark Side. Usually bad things come from war, very few good things, but sometimes good things come from bad things, that's true, nothing's that black and white. It's always the wrong solution to kill people.

Track listing 

Notes
Most versions feature an edited version of "The Sails of Charon". The editing removes an introduction of wind-like sound effects performed on guitar. Similar sound effects can be heard at the end of the song.
On "Born to Touch Your Feelings" guest women's voices can be heard. They are performed by some friends and fans: Junko and Mutsumi from Japan, Esther from Suriname, Rosa from Rome, Susan from L.A., and Leila from Tahiti.

Personnel 
Scorpions
 Klaus Meine – lead vocals
 Ulrich Roth – lead guitar, backing vocals
 Rudolf Schenker – rhythm guitar, backing vocals
 Francis Buchholz – bass, backing vocals
 Herman Rarebell – drums, percussion, backing vocals

Production
Dieter Dierks – producer, engineer, mixing

Cover versions 
 "We'll Burn the Sky" was covered by the Japanese metal musician Syu on his cover album Crying Stars -Stand Proud!- in 2010.
 "The Sails of Charon" was covered by the American thrash metal band Testament on their compilation album Signs of Chaos in 1997.
 "The Sails of Charon" was also covered by Yngwie Malmsteen on his 1996 cover album Inspiration
 "He's a Woman – She's a Man" was covered by the German power metal band Helloween on their cover album Metal Jukebox in 1999.
 "He's a Woman – She's a Man" was also covered by American thrash metal band Evildead on their album The Underworld in 1991.
 Another cover of "He's a Woman – She's a Man" was played by the American power metal band Helstar on their 1988 album A Distant Thunder.

References 

1977 albums
Scorpions (band) albums
RCA Records albums
Albums produced by Dieter Dierks